

List of compositions 
The following is a list of compositions by Jim Hall and collaborators, each followed by the album or albums on which it appears.

All songs written by Jim Hall except as noted in the following key:
1. co-written with Bob Brookmeyer
2. co-written with Don Thompson and Terry Clarke
3. co-written with Charlie Haden
4. co-written with Scott Colley and George Mraz
5. co-written with Scott Colley
6. co-written with Enrico Pieranunzi
7. co-written with Bill Frisell
8. co-written with Joey Baron
9. co-written with Pat Metheny
10. co-written with Marian McPartland

11. co-written with Bill Evans

 "1953 'Thesis'" 
 1991: Jim Hall - Live At Town Hall Volume 1 (MusicMasters)

A - C

 "A Merry Chase" 
 2006: Jim Hall and Geoffrey Keezer - Free Association (Contemporary)

 "Abstract 1"  3
 2001: Jim Hall - Jim Hall & Basses (Telarc)

 "Abstract 2"  4
 2001: Jim Hall - Jim Hall & Basses (Telarc)

 "Abstract 3"  4
 2001: Jim Hall - Jim Hall & Basses (Telarc)

 "Abstract 4"  5
 2001: Jim Hall - Jim Hall & Basses (Telarc)

 "All Across The City" 
 1964: Jimmy Raney - Two Jims and Zoot (Mainstream)
 1965: Paul Desmond - Glad to Be Unhappy (RCA Victor)
 1966: Bill Evans - Intermodulation (Verve)
 1989: Jim Hall - All Across The City (Concord)
 1992: Jim Hall - Youkali (CTI)
 1996: Bill Mays - Mays in Manhattan (Concord)
 1999: Jeanfrançois Prins - All Around Town (TCB)
 1999: Jim Hall and Pat Metheny - Jim Hall & Pat Metheny (Telarc)
 2000: Jim Hall, Joe Lovano, George Mraz, Lewis Nash - Grand Slam (Telarc)
 2003: Don Lanphere - Where Do You Start? (Origin)
 2004: Carl Amundson - Guitarists! (Blue Line)
 2007: Bill Charlap - Live at the Village Vanguard (Blue Note)
 2008: Jim Hall and Bill Frisell - Hemispheres (ArtistShare)
 2013: Owl Trio - Owl Trio (Losen Records)
 2014: Kevin Fort - Red Gold (self-released)
 2014: Satoshi Inoue - Plays Jim Hall (What's New)
 2015: Tom Dempsey - Waltz New (Origin)

 "And I Do" 
 1986: Jim Hall - Jim Hall's Three (Concord)
 2001: Tina Angotti - Mirror (Tina Angotti Music)

 "Arrowhead" 
 1957: Bob Brookmeyer - The Street Swingers (World Pacific)

 "Art Song" 
 1998: Jim Hall - By Arrangement (Telarc)

 "At Sea"  8
 2010: Jim Hall and Joey Baron - Conversations (ArtistShare)

 "Ballad Painting"  8
 2010: Jim Hall and Joey Baron - Conversations (ArtistShare)

 "Barbaro"  8
 2008: Jim Hall and Bill Frisell - Hemispheres (ArtistShare)

 "Beijing Blues"  7
 2008: Jim Hall and Bill Frisell - Hemispheres (ArtistShare)

 "Bent Blue" 
 2001: Jim Hall - Jim Hall & Basses (Telarc)
 2004: Jim Hall - Magic Meeting (Contemporary)

 "Bermuda Bye Bye" 
 1976: Jim Hall - Commitment (Horizon)

 "Big Blues" 
 1978: Jim Hall and Red Mitchell – Jim Hall & Red Mitchell (Artists House)
 1979: Art Farmer and Jim Hall - Big Blues (CTI)
 1989: Jim Hall - All Across The City (Concord)
 1995: René Mailhes - Gopaline (Iris)
 2014: Charlie Haden and Jim Hall - Charlie Haden/Jim Hall (Impulse!)
 2015: Tom Dempsey - Waltz New (Origin)

 "Bimini" 
 1987: Michel Petrucciani - Power of Three (Blue Note)
 1988: Jim Hall and Tom Harrell - These Rooms (DENON/Nippon Columbia)
 2008: Jim Hall and Bill Frisell - Hemispheres (ArtistShare)

 "Blue Joe" 
 1969: Jim Hall - It's Nice to Be With You (MPS)

 "Bluesography" 
 1994: Jim Hall - Dedications & Inspirations (Telarc)

 "Bon Ami" 
 1997: Bill Charlap - Distant Star (Criss Cross)
 1995: Jim Hall - Dialogues (Telarc)

 "Border Crossing" 
 2000: Jim Hall, Joe Lovano, George Mraz, Lewis Nash - Grand Slam (Telarc)

 "Bottlenose Blues" 
 1986: Jim Hall - Jim Hall's Three (Concord)

 "Calypso Joe" 
 1995: Jim Hall - Dialogues (Telarc)

 "Canto Neruda" 
 2004: Jim Hall - Magic Meeting (Contemporary)

 "Canto Nostálgico" 
 1994: Jim Hall - Dedications & Inspirations (Telarc)

 "Careful" 
 1959: Jimmy Giuffre - The Easy Way (Verve)
 1963: Gary Burton Something's Coming (RCA)
 1972: Jim Hall - Where Would I Be? (Milestone)
 1977: Jim Hall - Jazz Impressions of Japan (A&M)
 1978: Gary Burton - Times Square (ECM)
 1981: George Shearing and Jim Hall - First Edition (Concord)
 1987: Michel Petrucciani - Power of Three (Blue Note)
 1991: Jim Hall - Live At Town Hall Volume 2 (MusicMasters)
 1998: Interstring - Odahoda (Igmod)
 1998: Mark White - Tunch (Master Musicians)
 2004: Vic Juris - While My Guitar Gently Weeps (SteepleChase)
 2005: Jim Hall and Enrico Pieranunzi - Duologues (C.A.M.)
 2012: Jim Hall - Live Vol. 2-4 (ArtistShare)
 2014: Satoshi Inoue - Plays Jim Hall (What's New)
 2015: Paul Hemmings - The Blues and the Abstract Uke (Leading Tone)
 2015: Tom Dempsey - Waltz New (Origin)

 "Chorale and Dance" 
 1985: Ron Carter and Jim Hall - Telephone (Concord)

 "Chrissie" 
 1956: Chico Hamilton - Chico Hamilton Quintet in Hi Fi (Pacific Jazz)
 1958: Gerry Mulligan - Complete at Newport 1958 (Disconforme / Rare Live) released in 2008

 "Circus Dance" 
 1997: Jim Hall - Textures (Telarc)

 "Cold Spring" 
 1999: Jim Hall and Pat Metheny - Jim Hall & Pat Metheny (Telarc)

 "Conversations"  8
 2010: Jim Hall and Joey Baron - Conversations (ArtistShare)

 "Cross Court" 
 1996: Ed Neumeister - Mohican & the Great Spirit (TCB)
 1988: Jim Hall and Tom Harrell - These Rooms (DENON/Nippon Columbia)

D - H
 "Dialogue" 
 1995: Jim Hall - Dialogues (Telarc)

 "Down from Antigua" 
 1993: Jim Hall - Something Special (MusicMasters)
 2014: Charlie Haden and Jim Hall - Charlie Haden/Jim Hall (Impulse!)

 "Down the Line" 
 1976: Jim Hall - Commitment (Horizon)

 "Dream Steps" 
 1995: Jim Hall - Dialogues (Telarc)
 2001: Jim Hall - Jim Hall & Basses (Telarc)

 "Drop Shot" 
 1989: Jim Hall - All Across The City (Concord)

 Duologue 1-3  6
 2005: Jim Hall and Enrico Pieranunzi - Duologues (C.A.M.)

 "Echo" 
 1977: Jim Hall - Jazz Impressions of Japan (A&M)

 "End the Beguine!" 
 2001: Jim Hall - Jim Hall & Basses (Telarc)
 2006: Jim Hall and Geoffrey Keezer - Free Association (Contemporary)

 "Entre-Nous" 
 1997: Jim Hall - Panorama: Live at the Village Vanguard (Telarc)

 "Erb" 
 1968: Lee Konitz - The Lee Konitz Duets (Milestone)

 "Fanfare" 
 1997: Jim Hall - Textures (Telarc)

 "Free Piece" 10
 2005: Marian McPartland - 85 Candles: Live in New York (Concord)

 "Frisell Frazzle" 
 1995: Jim Hall - Dialogues (Telarc)

 "Furnished Flats" 
 1997: Jim Hall - Panorama: Live at the Village Vanguard (Telarc)
 2004: Jim Hall - Magic Meeting (Contemporary)
 2006: Jim Hall and Geoffrey Keezer - Free Association (Contemporary)

 "Hawk" 
 1994: Jim Hall - Dedications & Inspirations (Telarc)

 "Here Comes Jane" 
 1997: Jim Hall - Panorama: Live at the Village Vanguard (Telarc)

 "Hide and Seek" 
 1986: Jim Hall - Jim Hall's Three (Concord)
 1991: Jim Hall - Live At Town Hall Volume 2 (MusicMasters)

I - M
 "I Know (Theme)" 
 1957: Chico Hamilton - Chico Hamilton Quintet (Pacific Jazz)
 2002: Fred Lonberg-Holm - A Valentine for Fred Katz (Atavistic)
 2005: Jorge Cutello - On Vacation... (Union De Musicos Independientes)

 Improvisations, Nos. 1-5  9
 1999: Jim Hall and Pat Metheny - Jim Hall & Pat Metheny (Telarc)

 "In Repose"  8
 2010: Jim Hall and Joey Baron - Conversations (ArtistShare)

 "Jane" 
 1989: Jim Hall - All Across The City (Concord)

 "Jimlogue" 
 2005: Jim Hall and Enrico Pieranunzi - Duologues (C.A.M.)

 "João" 
 1994: Jim Hall - Dedications & Inspirations (Telarc)
 2014: Satoshi Inoue - Plays Jim Hall (What's New)

 "Kyoto Bells" 
 1977: Jim Hall - Jazz Impressions of Japan (A&M)

 "Light"  2
 1977: Jim Hall - Jazz Impressions of Japan (A&M)

 "Little Blues" 
 1997: Jim Hall - Panorama: Live at the Village Vanguard (Telarc)

 "Lookin' Up" 
 1999: Jim Hall and Pat Metheny - Jim Hall & Pat Metheny (Telarc)

 "Lucky Thing" 
 1993: Jim Hall - Something Special (MusicMasters)

 "Matisse" 
 1994: Jim Hall - Dedications & Inspirations (Telarc)

 "Migration"  7
 2008: Jim Hall and Bill Frisell - Hemispheres (ArtistShare)

 "Minotaur" 
 1972: Jim Hall - Where Would I Be? (Milestone)

 "Miró" 
 1994: Jim Hall - Dedications & Inspirations (Telarc)

 "Mister Blues" 
 1992: Jim Hall - Subsequently (MusicMasters)
 1998: Jim Hall - Jazzpar Quartet + 4 (Contemporary)

 "Monet" 
 1994: Jim Hall - Dedications & Inspirations (Telarc)
 2010: Jim Hall and Joey Baron - Conversations (ArtistShare)

 "Move It" 
 1964: Jimmy Raney - Two Jims and Zoot (Mainstream)

N - R
 "No, You Don't" 
 1997: Jim Hall - Panorama: Live at the Village Vanguard (Telarc)

 "October Song" 
 1998: Jim Hall - By Arrangement (Telarc)
 2006: Jim Hall and Geoffrey Keezer - Free Association (Contemporary)

 "Ouagadoudou" 
 2006: Jim Hall and Geoffrey Keezer - Free Association (Contemporary)

 "Osaka Express" 
 1978: Jim Hall and Red Mitchell – Jim Hall & Red Mitchell (Artists House)

 "Our Valentines"  6
 2005: Jim Hall and Enrico Pieranunzi - Duologues (C.A.M.)

 "Painted Pig" 
 1997: Jim Hall - Panorama: Live at the Village Vanguard (Telarc)

 "Pancho" 
 1992: Jim Hall - Subsequently (MusicMasters)

 "Pan-O-Rama" 
 1997: Jim Hall - Panorama: Live at the Village Vanguard (Telarc)

 "Passacaglia" 
 1997: Jim Hall - Textures (Telarc)

 "Piece for Guitar & Strings" 
 1961: John Lewis - Jazz Abstractions (Atlantic)

 "Pollock"  8
 2010: Jim Hall and Joey Baron - Conversations (ArtistShare)

 "Quadrologue" 
 1997: Jim Hall - Textures (Telarc)

 "Quartet + 4" 
 1998: Jim Hall - Jazzpar Quartet + 4 (Contemporary)

 "Ragman" 
 1997: Jim Hall - Textures (Telarc)

 "Raney Day" 
 1957: Bob Brookmeyer - The Street Swingers (World Pacific)

 "Reflections" 
 1997: Jim Hall - Textures (Telarc)

 "Reinhardt"  8
 2010: Jim Hall and Joey Baron - Conversations (ArtistShare)

 "Romaine" 
 1960: Modern Jazz Quartet - Pyramid (Atlantic)
 1962: Bill Evans and Jim Hall - Undercurrent (United Artists)
 1969: Jim Hall - It's Nice to Be With You (MPS)

 "Running Out of Gas" 
 1994: Jim Hall - Unissued 1982-1992 (Musica Jazz)

S - T
 "Safari"  8
 2010: Jim Hall and Joey Baron - Conversations (ArtistShare)

 "Sanctus" 
 2000: Greg Osby - The Invisible Hand (Blue Note)

 "Sam Jones" 
 2001: Jim Hall - Jim Hall & Basses (Telarc)

 "Say Hello to Calypso" 
 2000: Jim Hall, Joe Lovano, George Mraz, Lewis Nash - Grand Slam (Telarc)

 "Sazanami" 
 1997: Jim Hall - Textures (Telarc)

 "Seseragi" 
 1994: Jim Hall - Dedications & Inspirations (Telarc)
 2014: Satoshi Inoue - Plays Jim Hall (What's New)

 "Siete-Cuartro" 
 1957: Chico Hamilton - Chico Hamilton Quintet (Pacific Jazz)

 "Simple Samba" 
 1995: Jack Pezanelli - Pleasured Hands (Brownstone)
 1972: Jim Hall - Where Would I Be? (Milestone)
 2007: Carolbeth & David True - Two Times True (Victoria Company)
 2015: Keith Scott - The Ensenada Project (self-released)

 "Simple Things" 
 1995: Jim Hall - Dialogues (Telarc)

 "Slam" 
 2000: Jim Hall, Joe Lovano, George Mraz, Lewis Nash - Grand Slam (Telarc)
 2007: Joel Allouche - Close Meeting (Cristal Records)

 "Snowbound" 
 1995: Jim Hall - Dialogues (Telarc)

 "Something for Now 
 1977: Jim Hall - Jazz Impressions of Japan (A&M)

 "Something Special" 
 1993: Jim Hall - Something Special (MusicMasters)
 2000: Peter Eigenmann - Something Special (TCB)
 2005: Steve Carryer Trio - From Where We Stand (3181)
 2014: Satoshi Inoue - Plays Jim Hall (What's New)
 2015: Tom Dempsey - Waltz New (Origin)

 "Something Tells Me" 
 1988: Jim Hall and Tom Harrell - These Rooms (DENON/Nippon Columbia)

 "Something to Wish For" 
 1997: Jim Hall - Panorama: Live at the Village Vanguard (Telarc)

 "Steps" 
 1993: Jim Hall - Something Special (MusicMasters)

 "Stern Stuff" 
 1995: Jim Hall - Dialogues (Telarc)

 "Street Dance" 
 1994: Jim Hall - Dedications & Inspirations (Telarc)

 "Subsequently" 
 1992: Jim Hall - Subsequently (MusicMasters)
 1993: Jim Hall - Something Special (MusicMasters)
 2015: Tom Dempsey - Waltz New (Origin)

 "Sweet Basil"  1
 1999: Jim Hall and Bob Brookmeyer - Live At The North Sea Jazz Festival (Challenge)

 "Tango Loco" 
 2001: Jim Hall - Jim Hall & Basses (Telarc)

 "These Rooms" 
 1988: Jim Hall and Tom Harrell - These Rooms (DENON/Nippon Columbia)

 "Thesis" 
 1998: Jim Hall - Jazzpar Quartet + 4 (Contemporary)

 "Three" 
 1986: Jim Hall - Jim Hall's Three (Concord)
 1993: Jim Hall - Something Special (MusicMasters)
 1994: Jim Hall - Unissued 1982-1992 (Musica Jazz)

 "Time"  8
 2010: Jim Hall and Joey Baron - Conversations (ArtistShare)

 "Tom Brown's Buddy" 
 1958: Shelly Manne - The Gambit (Contemporary)

 "Travelogue"  8
 2010: Jim Hall and Joey Baron - Conversations (ArtistShare)

 "Two's Blues" 
 1975: Jim Hall - Concierto (CTI)
 1985: Ron Carter and Jim Hall - Telephone (Concord)
 2005: Alex Domschot - Venusian Commute (Dreambox Media)

U - Y
 "Uncle Ed" 
 1995: Jim Hall - Dialogues (Telarc)
 2010: Jim Hall and Joey Baron - Conversations (ArtistShare)

 "Waiting to Dance" 
 1992: Jim Hall - Subsequently (MusicMasters)
 1999: Jim Hall and Pat Metheny - Jim Hall & Pat Metheny (Telarc)
 2008: Jim Hall and Bill Frisell - Hemispheres (ArtistShare)

 "Walk Soft" 
 1976: Jim Hall - Commitment (Horizon)
 2014: Satoshi Inoue - Plays Jim Hall (What's New)

 "Waltz New" 
 1978: Jim Hall and Red Mitchell – Jim Hall & Red Mitchell (Artists House)
 1987: Michel Petrucciani - Power of Three (Blue Note)
 1995: Bill Charlap - Souvenir (Criss Cross)
 1998: Jane Miller - Secret Pockets (Pink Bubble)
 2000: Phillip DeGreg - Whirl Away (J Curve)
 2001: Blue Wisp Big Band - 20th Anniversary (Sea Breeze)
 2006: René Mailhes - Gitane (Iris Musique)
 2011: Phil DeGreg Whirl Away (J Curve)
 2014: Satoshi Inoue - Plays Jim Hall (What's New)
 2015: Tom Dempsey - Waltz New (Origin)
 2017: Brad Myers and Michael Sharfe - Sanguinaria (Hopefulsongs) (Colloquy)

 "What If?"  8
 2010: Jim Hall and Joey Baron - Conversations (ArtistShare)

 "Whistle Stop" 
 1994: Jim Hall - Dedications & Inspirations (Telarc)

 "Whose Blues?" 
 1972: Ron Carter and Jim Hall - Alone Together (Milestone)

 "Why Not Dance?" 
 1994: Jim Hall - Dedications & Inspirations (Telarc)

 "Without Words" 
 1977: Jim Hall - Jazz Impressions of Japan (A&M)
 1981: George Shearing and Jim Hall - First Edition (Concord)
 2003: Daedelus - Rethinking the Weather (Mush)

 "Young One (for Debra)" 
 1969: Jim Hall - It's Nice to Be With You (MPS)
 1977: Jim Hall - Jazz Impressions of Japan (A&M)
 1986: John Basile - Quiet Passage (Pro Jazz)
 1989: Jim Hall - All Across The City (Concord)
 1992: Jim Witzel - Give and Take'' (Joplin & Sweeney Music)

External links
 
 Jim Hall's fan website
 
 
 

Jazz compositions